General elections were held in Sweden on 18 September 1988. The Swedish Social Democratic Party remained the largest party in the Riksdag, winning 156 of the 349 seats.

Results

Seat distribution

By municipality

References

General elections in Sweden
General
Sweden
Sweden